The Metropolitan Sewers Act 1851 is an act of the Parliament of the United Kingdom. The act extended and amended the Metropolitan Commission of Sewers Act 1848 and the Metropolitan Sewers Act 1849, which would have otherwise expired at the end of that session of Parliament, until the end of the session of Parliament underway on 7 August 1852. The Act was superseded by the further Metropolitan Sewers Acts in 1852, 1853, 1854 and 1855.

Amendments
The provisions of the Act were:
That the Queen may appoint commissioners from the Metropolitan Commission of Sewers to be the Commission's chair and deputy chair.
That the salary of the Chair would be set at £1,000 per year.
That the Chair would also be chair at Courts of Sewers and that they would hold a casting vote at such meetings.
That the quorum for Commission meetings would be two.
That for meetings of the Commission to raise rates, borrow money, make a mortgage or grant an annuity six Commissioners must be present.
That six Commissioners need not be present if a court order allows otherwise.

References

United Kingdom Acts of Parliament 1851
1851 in British law
1851 in London
Water supply and sanitation in London